The Society of Saint Sava or Saint Sava Society was a Serbian non-governmental association with the aim of maintaining and protecting the Serb people in the Ottoman Empire, in Old Serbia and Macedonia, and in Austro-Hungarian Bosnia and Herzegovina, founded in 1886 in Belgrade, the capital of the Kingdom of Serbia. It was active, with a brief pause during the First World War, until the Invasion of Yugoslavia (1941).

History

Work in Macedonia

The society worked for dissemination of Serbian propaganda in the region of Macedonia and Old Serbia.  The Society offered paid scholarships to those who called themselves Serbo-Macedonians. The society  organized in Serbia specialized schools for children of Macedonia and Old Serbia and developed a propaganda among the Macedonians working in Serbia. Only three years later, its executive body became part of the Ministry of Foreign Affairs of Serbia. Its propaganda was so strong that after a sequence of student riots in the Bulgarian Men's High School of Thessaloniki, a group of 34 students accepted the proposal of the Serbian emissaries to go and study free of cost to Belgrade. They soon became aware of the obvious reasons behind its  program, when they were forbidden to possess Bulgarian literature. Subsequently, nearly the whole group left Belgrade to continue its education in Bulgaria. Among that group were Dame Gruev, Petar Pop Arsov, Krste Misirkov, Kosta Shahov, etc. As a result, one of the main reasons for the establishment of the Internal Macedonian Revolutionary Organization (IMRO) by Dame Gruev and Petar Pop Arsov in 1893 was to stop the spread of Serbian propaganda into Macedonia. Later the society's fellows constituted the backbone of the Serbian Chetnik Organization. Bulgarian contemporaries used the term "Serbomans" for Serbs in Macedonia.

Members
Founders
Svetomir Nikolajević, founder
Kosta Šumenković, founder
Stevan Vladislav Kaćanski, founder
Milan Đ. Milićević, founder
Ljubomir Kovačević, founder
Panta Srećković, founder
Miloš Milojević, founder
Milojko Veselinović, founder
Firmilijan Drazic, founder
Others
Temko Popov
Jovan Hadži-Vasiljević, secretary, editor of Brastvo
Spasoje Hadži Popović
Damjan Grujević
Petar Poparsov

Legacy
In 1994, an association with the same name was founded by 80 university professors.

References

Sources
Народна енциклопедија српско-хрватско-словеначка, Београд 1929, књига 1, 575

External links

Serbian cultural organizations
Serbian irredentism
Kingdom of Serbia
Ottoman Serbia
Ottoman period in the history of North Macedonia
19th century in Serbia
1886 establishments in Serbia
Serbian nationalism
Kosovo Serbs
Serbs of North Macedonia
Kosovo vilayet
Manastir vilayet
Salonica vilayet
Yugoslav Macedonia
Anti-Bulgarian sentiment
Serb organizations
Ethnic organizations based in Yugoslavia
Defunct organizations based in Serbia
Serbian nationalism in North Macedonia